Vieques, officially Isla de Vieques, is an island and municipality of Puerto Rico, in the northeastern Caribbean, part of an island grouping sometimes known as the Spanish Virgin Islands. Vieques is part of the Commonwealth of Puerto Rico, and retains strong influences from 400 years of Spanish presence in the island.

Its most populated barrio is the town of Isabel Segunda (sometimes written "Isabel II"), the administrative center located on the northern side of the island. The population of Vieques was 8,249 at the 2020 Census.

The island's name is a Spanish spelling of a Taíno word said to mean "small island" or "small land". It also has the nickname Isla Nena, usually translated as "Little Girl Island", alluding to its perception as Puerto Rico's little sister. The island was given this name by the Puerto Rican poet Luis Llorens Torres. During the British colonial period its name was Crab Island.

Vieques is best known internationally as the site of a series of protests against the United States Navy's use of the island as a bombing range and testing ground, which led to the Navy's departure in 2003. Today the former navy land is a national wildlife refuge; some of it is open to the public, but much remains closed off due to contamination and/or unexploded ordnance that the military is slowly cleaning up. Some of the most beautiful beaches on the island are on the eastern end of the island (formerly the Marine Base) that the Navy named Red Beach, Blue Beach, Caracas Beach, Pata Prieta Beach, La Chiva Beach, and Plata Beach. At the far western tip (formerly the Navy Base) is Punta Arenas, which the Navy named Green Beach. The beaches are commonly listed among the top beaches in the Caribbean for their azure waters and white sands.

History

Pre-Columbian history
Archaeological evidence suggests that Vieques was first inhabited by ancient Indigenous peoples of the Americas who traveled mostly from South America perhaps between 3000 BCE and 2000 BCE. Estimates of these prehistoric dates of inhabitation vary widely. These tribes had a Stone Age culture and were probably fishermen and hunter-gatherers.

Excavations at the Puerto Ferro site by Luis Chanlatte and Yvonne Narganes uncovered a fragmented human skeleton in a large hearth area. Radiocarbon dating of shells found in the hearth indicate a burial date of c. 1900 BCE. This skeleton, popularly known as El Hombre de Puerto Ferro, was buried at the center of a group of large boulders near Vieques's south-central coast, approximately one kilometer northwest of the Bioluminescent Bay. Linear arrays of smaller stones radiating from the central boulders are apparent at the site today, but their age and reason for placement are unknown.

Further waves of settlement by Native Americans followed over many centuries. The Arawak-speaking Saladoid (or Igneri) people, thought to have originated in modern-day Venezuela, arrived in the region perhaps around 200 BC (estimates vary). These tribes, noted for their pottery, stone carving, and other artifacts, eventually merged with groups from Hispaniola and Cuba to form what is now called the Taíno culture. This culture flourished in the region from around 1000 AD until the arrival of Europeans in the late 15th century.

Spanish colonial period
The European discovery of Vieques is sometimes credited to Christopher Columbus, who landed in Puerto Rico in 1493. It does not seem to be certain whether Columbus personally visited Vieques, but in any case the island was soon claimed by the Spanish. During the early 16th century Vieques became a center of Taíno rebellion against the European invaders, prompting the Spanish to send armed forces to the island to quell the resistance. The native Taíno population was decimated, and its people either killed, imprisoned or enslaved by the Spanish.

The Spanish did not, however, permanently colonize Vieques at this time, and for the next 300 years it remained a lawless outpost, frequented by pirates and outlaws. As European powers fought for control in the region, a series of attempts by the French, English and Danish to colonize the island in the 17th and 18th centuries were repulsed by the Spanish.

At the beginning of the 19th century, the Spanish took steps to permanently settle and secure the island. In 1811, Don Salvador Meléndez, then governor of Puerto Rico, sent military commander Juan Rosselló to begin what would become the annexation of Vieques by the Puerto Ricans. In 1832, under an agreement with the Spanish Puerto Rican administration, Frenchman Teófilo José Jaime María Le Guillou became Governor of Vieques, and undertook to impose order on the anarchic province. He was instrumental in the establishment of large plantations, marking a period of social and economic change. Le Guillou is now remembered as the founder of Vieques (though this title is also sometimes conferred on Francisco Saínz, governor from 1843 to 1852, who founded Isabel Segunda, the main town in Vieques, named after Queen Isabel II of Spain). Vieques was formally annexed to Puerto Rico in 1854.

In 1816, Vieques was briefly visited by Simón Bolívar when his ship ran aground there while fleeing defeat in Venezuela.

During the second part of the 19th century, thousands of slaves of African descent were brought to Vieques to work the sugarcane plantations. They arrived from mainland Puerto Rico and nearby islands of St. Thomas, Nevis, Saint Kitts, Saint Croix, and many other Caribbean islands. Slavery was abolished in Puerto Rico in 1873.

European colonial period

The island also received considerable attention as a possible colony from Scotland, and after numerous attempts to buy the island proved unsuccessful, the Scottish fleet, en route to Darien in 1698, made landfall and took possession of the island in the name of the Company of Scotland Trading to Africa and The Indies. Scottish sovereignty of the island proved short-lived, as a Danish ship arrived shortly afterward and claimed the island. From 1689 to 1693 the island was controlled by Brandenburg-Prussia as Krabbeninsel (German for crab island) where the English name Crab Island came from.

United States control

Puerto Rico was ceded by Spain in the aftermath of the Spanish–American War under the terms of the Treaty of Paris of 1898 and became a territory of the United States. In 1899, the United States conducted its first census of Puerto Rico finding that the population of Vieques was 6,642 (but this included 704 residents from a nearby island, Culebra).

In the 1920s and 1930s, the sugar industry, on which Vieques was dependent, went into decline due to falling prices and industrial unrest. Many locals were forced to move to mainland Puerto Rico or Saint Croix to look for work.

In 1941, while Europe was in the midst of World War II, the United States Navy purchased or seized almost eighty percent of Vieques as an extension to the Roosevelt Roads Naval Station nearby on the Puerto Rican mainland. It is said that the original purpose of the base (never implemented) was to provide a safe haven for the British fleet and the British royal family should Great Britain fall to Nazi Germany. This assertion does not match U.S. Navy documents and the obvious fact that Canada's Halifax harbor would have been a more likely fallback position for the British fleet, with British King George VI already reigning as King of Canada. The base was however seen as the Atlantic's counterpart of Pearl Harbor in the Pacific due to its strategic location. The Naval Station at Roosevelt Roads was a perfect location to defend the strategic approaches to the Panama Canal.

Much of the land was bought from the owners of large farms and sugar cane plantations, and the expropriations triggered the final demise of the sugar industry. Without consulting the local population who had lived and worked there for centuries and protested the expropriations,  the decision to turn it into a bombing range was made in Washington. In a similar way as the population of the Chagos Islands, who were displaced to make way for an Air Force Base in the Indian Ocean in the 1960s, many agricultural workers, who had no formal title to the land they occupied, were evicted and forced to migrate.

For over sixty years, the US military used the island (with a population of over 9000 inhabitants in 1950) as a live munitions target practice. According to internal Navy documents, bombardments occurred on 180 days out of a year on average. The US military used the highest possible contaminant depleted uranium (DU) munitions since 1972 on the populated (and full of exotic wildlife) island, at a rate of over 80 live bombs daily for decades. The health consequences are felt to this day as the cancer rates are ostensibly higher for the population of Vieques, specially children, than for those on the main island.

After the war, the US Navy continued to use the island for military exercises, and as a firing range and testing ground for munitions.

Protests and departure of the United States Navy

The continuing postwar presence in Vieques of the United States Navy drew protests from the local community, angry at the expropriation of their land and the environmental impact of weapons testing. The locals' discontent was exacerbated by the island's perilous economic condition.

Protests came to a head in 1999 when Vieques native David Sanes, a civilian employee of the United States Navy, was killed by a jet bomb that the Navy said misfired. Sanes had been working as a security guard. A popular campaign of civil disobedience resurged; not since the mid-1970s had Viequenses come together en masse to protest the target practices. The locals took to the ocean in their small fishing boats and successfully stopped the US Navy's military exercises for a short period, until the US Navy and two US Coast Guard cutters began controlling access to the island and escorting boaters away from Vieques.

On April 27, 2001, the Navy resumed operations and protesting resumed. At this point over 600 protesters had already been detained.

The Vieques issue became something of a cause célèbre, and local protesters were joined by sympathetic groups and prominent individuals from the mainland United States and abroad, including political leaders Rubén Berríos, Robert F. Kennedy, Jr., Al Sharpton and Jesse Jackson, singers Danny Rivera, Willie Colón and Ricky Martin, actors Edward James Olmos and Jimmy Smits, boxer Félix 'Tito' Trinidad, baseball superstar Carlos Delgado, writers Ana Lydia Vega and Giannina Braschi, and Guatemala's Nobel Prize winner Rigoberta Menchú. Kennedy's son, Aidan Caohman "Vieques" Kennedy, was born while his father served jail time in Puerto Rico for his role in the protests. The problems arising from the US Navy base have also featured in songs by various musicians, including Puerto Rican rock band Puya, rapper Immortal Technique and reggaeton artist Tego Calderón. In popular culture, one subplot of "The Two Bartlets" episode of The West Wing dealt with a protest on the bombing range led by a friend of White House Deputy Chief of Staff Josh Lyman; the character was modeled on future West Wing star Jimmy Smits, a native of Puerto Rico who was repeatedly arrested for leading protests there.

As a result of this pressure, in May 2003 the Navy withdrew from Vieques, and much of the island was designated a National Wildlife Refuge under the control of the United States Fish and Wildlife Service. The island was also placed on the National Priorities List (NPL), the list of hazardous waste sites in the United States eligible for long-term remedial action (cleanup) financed by the federal Superfund program. Closure of Roosevelt Roads Naval Station followed in 2004, and prior to Hurricane Maria the Roosevelt Roads Naval Station was reopened.

Hurricane Maria and rebuilding efforts

Puerto Rico was struck by Hurricane Maria on September 20, 2017, and the storm caused widespread devastation and a near-total shutdown of the island's tourism-based economy. The largest hotel on the island, The W, has not reopened since the storm, but most smaller hotels, bed and breakfasts, and Airbnb operators have resumed operations.

As of December 2019, the Susana Centeno Hospital in Vieques had not been repaired and remained shuttered. Expectant mothers had to travel to the main island of Puerto Rico to give birth. People needing dialysis had to travel to the main island. In November 2018, a mobile dialysis machine was delivered to a temporary clinic.

On January 21, 2020, the Federal Emergency Management Agency (FEMA) approved $39.5 million to help rebuild its only hospital after damage caused by Hurricane Maria. FEMA approved the funding after the Office of Management and Budget agreed to provide money to rebuild the Susan Centeno community health center based on its "replacement value."

The family of Jaideliz Moreno Ventura, 13, whose 2020 death was blamed on the lack of a functioning hospital and lifesaving medical equipment in Vieques, is suing the government for violation of human and civil rights. Funds for rebuilding the hospital were approved two weeks after Jaideliz's death, but as of January 31, 2021, it has not been rebuilt.

While Governor Pedro Pierluisi expected construction to begin on the hospital rebuild in 2022, it was delayed until 2023 with the holdup blamed on both construction complications on the island and further bureaucratic proceduress by FEMA.

Government

Vieques is a municipio of Puerto Rico, translated as "municipality" and in this context roughly equivalent to "township". It is in the Puerto Rican electoral district of Carolina. Local government is under the leadership of a mayor, presently Junito Corcino.

Vieques belongs to the Puerto Rico Senatorial district VIII, which is represented by two Senators. In 2012, Pedro A. Rodríguez and Luis Daniel Rivera were elected as District Senators.

Barrios

Vieques is divided into eight (barrios), including the downtown barrio called Isabel Segunda.

Sectors

Barrios (which are like minor civil divisions) in turn are further subdivided into smaller local populated place areas/units called sectores (sectors in English). The types of sectores may vary, from normally sector to urbanización to reparto to barriada to residencial, among others.

Special Communities

 (Special Communities of Puerto Rico) are marginalized communities whose citizens are experiencing a certain amount of social exclusion. A map shows these communities occur in nearly every municipality of the commonwealth. Of the 742 places that were on the list in 2014, the following barrios, communities, sectors, or neighborhoods were in Vieques: Sector Gobeo in Barrio Florida, Bravos de Boston, 
Jagüeyes, Monte Carmelo, Pozo Prieto (Monte Santo) and Villa Borinquén.

Geography

To the north of Vieques is the Atlantic Ocean, and to the south, the Caribbean. Vieques and Culebra, together with various small islets, make up the Spanish Virgin Islands, sometimes known as the Passage Islands.

The former US Navy lands, now wildlife reserves, occupy the entire eastern and western ends of Vieques, with the former live weapons testing site (known as the "LIA", or "Live Impact Area") at the extreme eastern tip. These areas are unpopulated. The former civilian area occupies very roughly the central third of the island and contains the towns of Isabel Segunda on the north coast, and Esperanza on the south.

Vieques has a terrain of rolling hills, with a central ridge running east–west. Geologically the island is composed of a mixture of volcanic bedrock, sedimentary rocks such as limestone and sandstone, and alluvial deposits of gravel, sand, silt, and clay. There are no permanent rivers or streams. Much former agricultural land has been reclaimed by nature due to prolonged disuse, and, apart from some small-scale farming in the central region, the island is largely covered by brush and subtropical dry forest. Around the coast lie palm-fringed sandy beaches interspersed with lagoons, mangrove swamps, salt flats and coral reefs.

A series of nearshore islets and rocks are part of the municipality of Vieques, clockwise starting at the northernmost:
Roca Cucaracha (a rock of less than five meters in diameter)
Isla Yallis 
Roca Alcatraz 
Cayo Conejo 
Cayo Jalovita 
Cayo Jalova 
Isla Chiva 
Cayo Chiva 
Cayo de Tierra
Cayo de Afuera (Cayo Real)

Bioluminescent Bay

The Vieques Bioluminescent Bay (also known as Puerto Mosquito, Mosquito Bay, or "The Bio Bay"), was declared the "Brightest bioluminescent bay" in the world by Guinness World Records in 2006, and is listed as a national natural landmark, one of five in Puerto Rico. The luminescence in the bay is caused by a microorganism, the dinoflagellate Pyrodinium bahamense, which glows whenever the water is disturbed, leaving a trail of neon blue.

A combination of factors creates the necessary conditions for bioluminescence: red mangrove trees surround the water (the organisms have been related to mangrove forests although mangrove is not necessarily associated with this species); a complete lack of modern development around the bay; the water is warm enough and deep enough; and a small channel to the ocean keeps the dinoflagellates in the bay. This small channel was created artificially, the result of attempts by the occupants of Spanish ships to choke off the bay from the ocean. The Spanish believed that the bioluminescence they encountered there while first exploring the area was the work of the devil and tried to block ocean water from entering the bay by dropping huge boulders in the channel. The Spanish only succeeded in preserving and increasing the luminescence in the now isolated bay.

Kayaking is permitted in the bay and may be arranged through local vendors.

Climate
Vieques has a warm, relatively dry, tropical climate. Average daily minima are about 18 °F or 6 °C lower. The west of the island receives significantly more rainfall than the east. Prevailing winds are easterly.

Vieques is prone to tropical storms and at risk from hurricanes from June to November. In 1989, Hurricane Hugo caused considerable damage to the island, and in 2017, Hurricane Maria also caused major damage.

Demographics

2020
According to the 2020 Census, Vieques is the third-least populous municipality (after Maricao and Culebra) with a population of 8,249.

8.0% of the population is of non-Hispanic origin, making it the second-least Hispanic municipality in Puerto Rico after Culebra. This represents an increase from 2010, when only 5.7% of the population was non-Hispanic.

2010
The 2010 US census, showed the total population of Vieques was 9,301. 94.3% of the population are Hispanic or Latino (of any race).

Language
Both Spanish and English are recognized as official languages. Spanish is the primary language of most inhabitants.

Economy
The sugar industry, once the mainstay of the island's economy, declined during the early 20th century, and finally collapsed in the 1940s when the US Navy took over much of the land on which the sugar cane plantations stood. After an initial naval construction phase, opportunities to make a living on the island were increased to include not only fishing or subsistence farming, but also Naval jobs. Crops grown on the island include avocados, bananas, coconuts, grains, papayas and sweet potatoes. A number of permanent local jobs were provided by the US Navy, and their economy benefited. Starting in the 1970s General Electric had employed a few hundred workers at a manufacturing plant but that plant subsequently closed.  Unemployment was widespread, with consequent social problems. The 2000 US census reported a median household income in 1999 dollars of $9,331 (compared to $41,994 for the US as a whole), and 35.8% of the population of 16 years and over in the labor force (compared to 63.9% for the US as a whole).

Following the 2003 departure of the US Navy, the frail economy of the island was left in shambles, and efforts had to be made to redevelop the island's agricultural economy, clean up contaminated areas of the former bombing ranges, and to develop Vieques as a tourist destination. The Navy cleanup is now the island's largest employer, and has contributed over $20 million to the local economy over the last five years through salaries, housing, vehicles, taxes, and services. The Navy has provided specialized training to several local islanders.

Tourism

For sixty years the majority of Vieques was closed off by the US Navy, and the island remained almost entirely undeveloped for tourism. This lack of development is now marketed as a key attraction. Vieques is promoted under an ecotourism banner as a sleepy, unspoiled island of rural bucolic charm and pristine deserted beaches, and is rapidly becoming a popular destination.

Since the Navy's departure, tensions on the island have been low, although land speculation by foreign developers and fears of overdevelopment have caused some resentment among local residents, and there are occasional reports of lingering anti-American sentiment.

The lands previously owned by the Navy have been turned over to the U.S. National Fish and Wildlife Service and the authorities of Puerto Rico and Vieques for management. The immediate bombing range area on the eastern tip of the island suffers from severe contamination, but the remaining areas are mostly open to the public, including many beautiful beaches that were inaccessible to civilians while the military was conducting training maneuvers.

Snorkeling is excellent, especially at Blue Beach (Bahía de la Chiva). Aside from archeological sites, such as La Hueca, and deserted beaches, a unique feature of Vieques is the presence of two pristine bioluminescent bays, including Mosquito Bay. Vieques is also famous for its paso fino horses, which are owned by locals and left to roam free over parts of the island.

In 2011, TripAdvisor listed Vieques among the Top 25 Beaches in the World, writing "If you prefer your beaches without the accompanying commercial developments, Isla de Vieques is your tanning turf, with more than 40 beaches and not one traffic light."

As of summer 2020, travel to the island was restricted due to the COVID-19 outbreak.

Landmarks and places of interest

Fortín Conde de Mirasol (Count Mirasol Fort), a fort built by the Spanish in the mid 19th century, now a museum
Playa Esperanza (Esperanza Beach)
The tomb of Le Guillou, the town founder, in Isabel Segunda
La Casa Alcaldía (City Hall)
Faro Punta Mulas, built in 1896
Faro de Puerto Ferro
Sun Bay Beach
The Bioluminescent Bay
The 300-year-old ceiba tree
Rompeolas (Mosquito Pier), renamed Puerto de la Libertad David Sanes Rodríguez in 2003
Puerto Ferro Archaeological Site
Black Sand Beach (Playa Negra)
Hacienda Playa Grande (Old Sugarcane Plantation Building)
Underground U.S. Navy Bunkers
Wreckage of the World War II Navy Destroyer

Culture

Festivals and events

Vieques celebrates its patron saint festival in July. The  is a religious and cultural celebration that generally features parades, games, artisans, amusement rides, regional food, and live entertainment.

Other festivals and events celebrated in Vieques include:
 Three Kings Festival – (or Epiphany Festival) – January 6
  (Vieques Cultural Festival) – June
  – August/September

Symbols
The  has an official flag and coat of arms.

Flag
The Vieques flag, approved in 1975, contains a representation of the municipal coat of arms and maintains its same symbolism. It consists of seven horizontal straight stripes, of equal width, four white and three blue, alternated. In its center is a green rhombus where a simplified design of the castle appears in yellow. The naval crown seen on the coat of arms is omitted from the flag.

Coat of arms
On a barry shield with silver and blue waves is a green rhombus with a gold castle and on top is a golden crown with silver sails. The silver and blue waves symbolize the sea around Vieques. In the green rhombus is a historic Vieques fort represented by the traditional Spanish heraldic castle.

Transportation
Vieques is served by Antonio Rivera Rodríguez Airport, which currently accommodates only small propeller-driven aircraft. Services to the island run from San Juan's Luis Muñoz Marín International Airport, Isla Grande Airport (20- to 30-minute flights) and from Ceiba Airport (5-minute flights) and to Culebra. Flights are also available between Vieques and Saint Croix, Tortola, Virgin Gorda and Saint Thomas.

Also, a ferry runs from Ceiba several times a day. The ferry service is administered by the Autoridad de Transporte Marítimo (ATM) in Puerto Rico. In 2019, governor Wanda Vázquez Garced said she would address the troubled, inconsistent ferry service between the islands and Ceiba.

There are 13 bridges in Vieques, none of them distinguished.

Public health

There have been claims linking Vieques' higher cancer rate to the long history of weapons testing on the island.

Milivi Adams was a girl from Vieques who developed and died of cancer and became a symbol in the battle against the US military presence in Vieques. Her face had appeared many times on the covers of Puerto Rican newspapers and magazines, and there were posters with her picture on them on many of Vieques' street corners. The daughter of Zuleyka Calderon and Jose Adams, Milivi was diagnosed with cancer at the age of two. Although many people blamed the military's bomb tests in Vieques as the source of her cancer, this has not been proven. Given a month to live at the age of three, her cancer went into remission, but at the age of four reappeared, in her brain. She was flown to the United States by her parents, in hopes that treatment would help her; she fought infections, and after the last one, doctors told her parents that her body would not resist another infection treatment. She returned to Puerto Rico, where she died on the morning of November 17, 2002. With the high levels of cancer and heart disease on the island of Vieques, the healthcare system in place was not suited to handle the amount of illness. Vieques, with a population of around 9,000 people, is home to the highest sick rates of all the Caribbean. People who lived in Vieques were eight times more likely to die of heart disease and had a 27% higher chance of developing cancer than any other part of Puerto Rico. The only hospital on the entire island was called Centro de Salud de Vieques, and during hurricane Maria was the only operating emergency room. Centro de Salud de Vieques has now been turned into a health care center, leaving the island with no emergency care facilities. During the hurricane Vieques was met with harsh flooding, and many severe injuries that the hospital could not take on. This resulted in mass casualties, and started many reforms on patient care on the island. Vieques en Rescate hatched a new plan involving Puerto Rico’s Department of Health, where they are coordinating for an oncologist and oncology nurse to see patients locally once a month. Currently, around 15 patients a month have participated in these consults, and have shown great success with the program. But a majority of patients still have to be transported to San Juan, 80 miles from Vieques on the main island, to receive chemotherapy or dialysis treatments. Today there are blocks of colorful bricks to honor the deceased, and to stand up to the healthcare crisis that arose in Vieques. 

Nayda Figueroa, an epidemiologist for Puerto Rico's Cancer Registry, stated that research showed Vieques' cancer rate from 1995 to 1999 was 31 percent higher than for the main island.  Michael Thun, head of epidemiological research at the American Cancer Society, cautioned that the variations in the rates could be attributed to chance, given the small population on Vieques. 
A 2000 Nuclear Regulatory Commission report concluded that "the public had not been exposed to depleted uranium contamination above normal background (naturally occurring) levels".

By 2002, it was evident that thousands of tons of steel that had originally been irradiated in the 1958 nuclear tests was missing from the wreckage in the bay. That steel has been missing for over 35 years and is still unaccounted for by the US Navy, Environmental Protection Agency and US Agency for Toxic Substances and Disease Registry (ATSDR). Hundreds of steel drums of unknown origin were found among the wreckage. Their identity and contents have not been adequately verified.

In response to concerns about potential contamination from toxic metals and other chemicals, the ATSDR conducted a number of surveys in 1999–2002 to test Vieques' soil, water supply, air, fish and shellfish for harmful substances. The general conclusion of the ATSDR survey was that no public health hazard existed as a result of the Navy's activities. However, scientists have pointed out that fish samples were drawn from local markets, which often import fish from other areas. Also sample sizes from each location were too small to provide compelling evidence for the lack of a public health danger (Wargo, Green Intelligence). The conclusions of the ATSDR report have more recently, been questioned and discredited. A review is underway.

Casa Pueblo, a Puerto Rican environmental group, reported "a series of studies pertaining to the flora and fauna of Vieques that clearly demonstrates sequestration of high levels of toxic elements in plant and animal tissue samples. Consequently, the ecological food web of the Vieques Island has been adversely impacted."

Notable natives and residents
 Jaime Rexach Benitez, educator, politician and humanist;
 Nelson Dieppa, professional boxer;
 Juan Francisco Luis, Governor of the U.S. Virgin Islands (1978–1987);
 Germán Rieckehoff Sampayo, was president of the Puerto Rican Olympic committee;
 Carlos Vélez Rieckehoff, local nationalist leader and political activist;
 David Sanes Rodríguez, civilian killed by the US Navy in a live-fire bombing practice, his death sparked protests that culminated in the US Navy leaving the island.

Gallery

See also

List of Puerto Ricans
History of Puerto Rico
Did you know-Puerto Rico?
United States Navy in Vieques, Puerto Rico
List of Vieques birds
National Register of Historic Places listings in Vieques
Kahoolawe
Vieques National Wildlife Refuge
Culebra, Puerto Rico
Hurricane Maria

References

External links

Topographic map of Vieques in the Library of Congress archives
Vieques, Puerto Rico: ATSDR Documents Dealing with the Isla de Vieques Bombing Range
Welcome to Puerto Rico! Vieques
Archivo Histórico de Vieques Collection hosted in the Digital Library of the Caribbean
Diaspora Project DH Center at UPR-RP Collection hosted in the Digital Library of the Caribbean

 
Municipalities of Puerto Rico
Populated places established in 1832
Former Scottish colonies
Places with bioluminescence